The inverse magnetostrictive effect, magnetoelastic effect or Villari effect, after its discoverer Emilio Villari, is the change of the magnetic susceptibility of a material when subjected to a mechanical stress.

Explanation 
The magnetostriction  characterizes the shape change of a ferromagnetic material during magnetization, whereas the inverse magnetostrictive effect characterizes the change of sample magnetization (for given magnetizing field strength ) when mechanical stresses  are applied to the sample.

Qualitative explanation of magnetoelastic effect 
Under a given uni-axial mechanical stress , the flux density  for a given magnetizing field strength  may increase or decrease. The way in which a material responds to stresses depends on its saturation magnetostriction . For this analysis, compressive stresses  are considered as negative, whereas tensile stresses are positive.
According to Le Chatelier's principle:

This means, that when the product  is positive, the flux density  increases under stress. On the other hand, when the product  is negative, the flux density  decreases under stress. This effect was confirmed experimentally.

Quantitative explanation of magnetoelastic effect 
In the case of a single stress  acting upon a single magnetic domain, the magnetic strain energy density  can be expressed as:

Consequently, the magnetization is increased by tension.

Magnetoelastic effect in a single crystal 
In fact, magnetostriction is more complex and depends on the direction of the crystal axes. In iron, the [100] axes are the directions of easy magnetization, while there is little magnetization along the [111] directions (unless the magnetization becomes close to the saturation magnetization, leading to the change of the domain orientation from [111] to [100]).

 In cubic materials, the magnetostriction along any axis can be defined by a known linear combination of these two constants.
 Under assumptions of isotropic magnetostriction (i.e. domain magnetization is the same in any crystallographic directions), then  and the linear dependence between the elastic energy and the stress is conserved, .

Method of testing the magnetoelastic properties of magnetic materials 

Method suitable for effective testing of magnetoelastic effect in magnetic materials should fulfill the  following requirements:
 magnetic circuit of the tested sample should be closed. Open magnetic circuit causes demagnetization, which reduces magnetoelastic effect and complicates its analysis.
 distribution of stresses should be uniform. Value and direction of stresses should be known.
 there should be the possibility of making the magnetizing and sensing windings on the sample - necessary to measure magnetic hysteresis loop under mechanical stresses.

Following testing methods were developed:
 tensile stresses applied to the strip of magnetic material in the shape of a ribbon. Disadvantage: open magnetic circuit of the tested sample.
 tensile or compressive stresses applied to the frame-shaped sample. Disadvantage: only bulk materials may be tested. No stresses in the joints of sample columns.
 compressive stresses applied to the ring core in the sideways direction. Disadvantage: non-uniform stresses distribution in the core .
 tensile or compressive stresses applied axially to the ring sample. Disadvantage: stresses are perpendicular to the magnetizing field.

Applications of magnetoelastic effect 

Magnetoelastic effect can be used in development of force sensors. This effect was used for sensors:
 in civil engineering.
 for monitoring of large diesel engines in locomotives.
 for monitoring of ball valves.
 for biomedical monitoring.

Inverse magnetoelastic effects have to be also considered as a side effect of accidental or intentional application of mechanical stresses to the magnetic core of inductive component, e.g. fluxgates or generator/motor stators when installed with interference fits.

References

See also 
 Magnetostriction
 Magnetocrystalline anisotropy

Magnetism
Magnetic ordering